It is widely believed that in the tumultuous years following the Victorian gold rush that a number of robberies by armed bandits, known in Australia as bushrangers, took place on St Kilda Road, then a track through the scrub from the city to the seaside settlement of St Kilda. However only two events are recorded, and only one took place on today's St Kilda Road.

It was probably the audacity of the first event, which was depicted in a famous Bushrangers on the St Kilda Road, painted 30 years after the event, that gave rise to the later reputation for hold-ups. 

This event took place over 2 1/2 hours in the afternoon of 16th October 1852, when 19 people were held up one by one or in groups, robbed, and tied up together at a spot near Glenhuntly Road, on the part of the road now known as Brighton Road that continues past St Kilda.  “ The first victims appear to have been William Keel and William Robinson of Brighton who were driving in a cart down Brighton Road towards Brighton. After they had passed the St. Kilda racecourse and somewhere in the vicinity of Glenhuntly Road, they saw two men walking a little in front of them. There were two or three men with guns beside them, and they were looking in the trees, apparently for birds. 

Suddenly Keel and Robinson were surrounded, with guns pointed at their heads and that of their horse. At first, when they were ordered out of the cart, they thought the whole thing was a joke. Then, when they were roughly told that their brains would be blown out if they did not hurry, they realized that it was serious, and got out of the cart. They were quickly robbed of £28 and £46 and ordered to take their cart into a nearby wattle thicket. Here a halter was cut in shreds and used to tie them together. They were ordered to sit on the ground while two men stood guard over them with double-barrelled guns. 

At one stage the ring leader told the guard to put the victims together so that if he fired and missed one he would kill another. Mention was also made to one man already having been killed that after-noon and his body being put down a waterhole. However, no mention is made of his body in any of the reports. More people were robbed during the next few hours, until there were nineteen captives sitting in a ring in the bush, all tied together.

.....

Finally, at sunset, the bushrangers withdrew their guard, mounted their horses which had been tethered in the bush, and rode off in the direction of South Yarra. Their victims released themselves and went on their ways. The gang seems to have comprised between four and six men, none of whom wore any disguise. There was much calling and cooeeing about the bush which confused their victims and possibly led them to believe that there were more men than was actually the case. Some days later five bushrangers, thought to be the same gang, spent an afternoon bailing up travellers near Dandenong.”

Brighton Bushrangers, St Kilda Historical Society, 2015No one was ever convicted.  

The other event took place earlier, on 17 March 1853, on the road near Canvas Town, a temporary settlement of tents on the west side of St Kilda Road not far from the city which provided temporary accommodation for the thousands who poured into Melbourne each week during the gold rush in Victoria. Gold-buyer Edward Ritter and his brother-in-law Samuel Maxwell Alexander were riding in their chaise-cart from St Kilda to Melbourne.  A gang of eight or nine men attempted to hold them up, but Ritter managed to pull away from the potential robbers.  A volley of shots were fired, of which three hit Ritter in the legs, without causing any serious injury.

Ritter and Alexander furnished good descriptions of their assailants, two of whom had been amongst a similar group who had tried to rob Ritter about three weeks earlier, who he recognised.  The Government offered a reward of £1600, calculated at £200 per head, for their arrests leading to conviction, and the Melbourne police began to round up likely suspects.  Seven men faced Justice Redmond Barry on 18 April 1853, five being convicted - Higginbotham, Little, Murphy William Burns, and James Burns - each sentenced to ten years’ hard labour on the roads, the first two in chains. Two others, Thompson and James Grimes, were acquitted. Grimes had been arrested on suspicion of taking part in the Nelson robbery in 1852, but there had been insufficient evidence to convict him.

George Wilson, who was believed to be involved, was later hanged for the McIvor Escort Robbery.

References

Further reading 
John Rochfort, The Adventures of a Surveyor in New Zealand and the Australian Goldfields, London, 1853
Frank Clune, Captain Melville, Angus and Robertson, Sydney, 1956 

History of Victoria (Australia)
1853 crimes in Australia
1853 in Australia
Bushrangers
Robberies in Australia
1850s in Victoria (Australia)
March 1853 events
1850s crimes in Australia